Salaudeen Adebola Latinwo  (born 1943) is a retired group captain in the Nigerian Air Force and a former military governor of Kwara State, Nigeria, under Muhammadu Buhari's military government.

Latinwo was part of the pioneering sets of officer cadets recruited into the Nigerian Air Force (NAF) in 1963, under the first chief of air staff of the Nigerian Airforce, Colonel Gerhard Kahtz, who was on secondment as head of the German Air Force Assistance Group (GAFAG). The Nigerian Air force was formally established on 18 April 1964 under the Air Force Act 1964.

Latinwo is one of Nigeria's egalitarian leaders.

Military career
From 28 August 1963 to 21 June 1966, Latinwo attended basic and advance military training in Uetersen, Western Germany, where he trained as an air force officer. In Western Germany, Latinwo attended training for his flying wings and attended the College of Navigation, West Germany, for his certificate in air navigation, which he completed in 1966. He was commissioned as a second lieutenant in 1966 upon his arrival from West Germany to Nigeria. Latinwo was adjutant, Kaduna Air force Base from 1966–68, and assistant base commander, Nigerian Air force base (NAF base) Kano, Nigeria 1970–71 and deputy base commander, NAF Base, Benin City (1971–72).

In 1972, Latinwo attended for a six-month conversion training on Ilyushin Il-28 fighter-bomber aircraft in Cairo, Egypt, and attended the Fokker F-27 Aircraft Management Course in Amsterdam, the Netherlands in 1972. He was promoted to the rank of captain in 1972.

He was appointed the director of training at the Nigerian Air Force (NAF) Headquarters between 1972 and 1974. Latinwo proceeded to the Junior Command and Staff College in the United Kingdom in 1974 for further military training. In 1975, Latinwo had Type rating Training on C-130 Hercules Transport Aircraft in Atlanta, Georgia, United States.

Latinwo was appointed director of operations at the headquarters of the Nigerian Air force between 1975 and 1977. In 1976, Latinwo attended the Command and Staff College, Jaji, Nigeria. From 1977 to 1978, he was appointed base commander for Nigerian Air Force Base (NAF base) Makurdi, Nigeria.

From 1978 to 1979, Latinwo was appointed base commander for Nigerian Air Force Base (NAF base) Kaduna. He was promoted to the rank of wing commander in 1979.

In 1980, he was appointed the senior staff officer for air operations (Defence Headquarters) Lagos, Nigeria.

In 1981, Latinwo was promoted to the rank of group captain. In 1984, Group Captain Salaudeen Adebola Latinwo was nominated by the Chief of Air Staff, Air Vice-Marshal Ibrahim Mahmud Alfa, and appointed by Major-General Muhammadu Buhari, the head of state as the new Military Governor of Kwara State, a position he held until August 1985.

When Major-General Ibrahim Babangida took power in 1985, as military president of Nigeria, Latinwo was appointed as the new commander (director) of the Directorate of Administration at the Nigerian Air Force Headquarters, Lagos, Nigeria, until he was finally retired from the Nigerian Air force in March 1986.

Governor of Kwara State
In January 1984, the Nigerian head of state, Major-General Muhammadu Buhari, appointed Group Captain S.A. Latinwo as governor of Kwara state to carry out economic, political, and social reforms in the state.

During Major-General Buhari's official visit to Kwara State, between 9 and 12 April 1985, as the head of the Federal Military Government, Commander-In-Chief of the Armed Forces of the Federal Republic of Nigeria, Buhari said "I wish to say that the State Government under the able leadership of the Kwara State Military Governor, Group Captain Salaudeen Adebola Latinwo has done a lot to better, the lots of the masses throughout Kwara State. His actions have instilled discipline and increase peoples confidence in his Administration".

Political appointments
In 1999, Group Captain S.A. Latinwo (rtd) and other retired military officers became power factor in Nigeria. In 2001, when President Olusegun Obasanjo approved the composition of the boards of Federal Government Parastatals, Group Captain Salaudeen Adebola Latinwo (Rtd) was named as a board member of Federal Airports Authority of Nigeria (FAAN).

In 2008, Group Captain S.A. Latinwo (rtd) was appointed by President Umaru Yar'Adua as the chairman for Kwara State for the National Committee on Mineral Resources and Environmental Compliance (MIREMCO).

Personal and early life
Salaudeen Adebola Latinwo was born into the famous and mega rich Aliu Onaolapo Olatinwo family of Offa, in Offa local government of Kwara State in 1943. Latinwo is one of 43 children of 10 wives of his father Aliu Olatinwo.

Latinwo attended St. Marks Primary School from 1950 to 1956 in Offa, Kwara State, Nigeria. He was also educated at Offa Grammar School, Offa, Kwara State, Nigeria, from 1957 to 1961, where he obtained his West African School Certificate.

In 1961, Latinwo joined the Northern Nigeria Civil Service, and worked at the Northern Nigeria Ministry of Education until 1963. He went to the National Institute of Administration in the United Kingdom in 1962 for an executive officers' course, and he rose to the rank of an assistant chief executive officer in the then Northern Nigeria Ministry of Education.

In 1963,  the Sardauna of Sokoto and Premier of Northern Nigeria, Alhaji Ahmadu Bello, handpicked Latinwo from the Northern Nigeria Ministry of Education and other youths from Nigeria for training in Germany, to form the nucleus of the Nigerian Air Force. Latinwo was recruited into the Nigerian Air Force in 1963 to represent the northern part of the country.

In 1971, Latinwo married his only wife, Mrs. Mercy Latinwo (née Aganga). He has four children. His first son is being groomed as a future governor of Kwara State.

Latinwo is the brother-in-law to the former Nigerian Minister of Finance and former Minister of Industry, Trade & Investment Olusegun Olutoyin Aganga

Awards
Group Captain S.A. Latinwo (rtd) has received several awards and decorated with many military medals. In alphabetical order they include:

Defence Service Medal(DSM)  
Force Service Star (FSS) 
General Service Medal (GSM) 
National Service Medal (NSM) 
Outstanding Leadership Award was conferred on Latinwo by the Governor of Kwara State, Abdulfatah Ahmed on 27 May 2017.
Republic Medal (RM)

References

1943 births
Living people
Governors of Kwara State
Yoruba military personnel
Yoruba politicians
People from Kwara State